Mehmet Bozdağ (born 1 January 1983 ) is a Turkish screenwriter, film producer, and director. He is also the founder and owner of production company Bozdağ Film.

Early life 

Bozdağ was born in Kayseri, Turkey and educated at Sakarya University. He also completed his master's degree in sociology at the same university. Bozdağ started his historical studies in 2004.

Career 
In 2009, Bozdağ worked as a screenwriter for TRT documentaries "Son Rüya" and "Kardeş Şehirler". In 2010, he wrote a documentary named "Ustalar, Alimler ve Sultanlar".

In 2014, Bozdağ made a historical Turkish drama series Diriliş: Ertuğrul. The show was very popular in Turkey and Pakistan. The next year, in 2015, he then made the season 2 for Diriliş: Ertuğrul. In the same year, he also made another historical drama named Yunus Emre: Aşkın Yolculuğu.

Bozdağ announced in 2020 that he had been working on the new project since 2018, at the request of the Government of Uzbekistan. In February 2021, Bozdağ's drama series Mendirman Jaloliddin was released on television.

He currently writes and produces the TV series Kuruluş: Osman, which aired on ATV from November 2019. In May 2020, Bozdağ announced that he wants to collaborate with Pakistan for a future co-production.

Filmography

Documentaries 

 Son Rüya (2009)
 Kardeş Şehirler (2009)
Ustalar, Alimler ve Sultanlar (2010)
Gönül Hırsızı [tr] (2013)

Television series

Awards and nominations

See also 
 List of Turkish film directors

References

External links
 
 

1983 births
Living people
Turkish Muslims
People from Kayseri
Turkish film producers
Turkish male screenwriters
Turkish film directors
Sakarya University alumni